"Map of the World (Part II)" is a song by the Canadian singer/songwriter Jane Siberry. It is the second single released in support of her third album The Speckless Sky, issued in 1985.

Formats and track listing 
All songs written by Jane Siberry.
Canadian 7" single (DSR 81019)
"Map of the World (Part II)" – 5:07
"The Empty City" – 4:20

US 7" single (OS-0021)
"Map of the World (Part II)" (edit) – 3:59
"The Taxi Ride" – 5:38

US 12" single (OA-17415)
"Map of the World (Part II)" (edit) – 3:59
"Seven Steps to the Wall" – 5:11
"The Taxi Ride" – 5:38

Charts

Personnel
Adapted from the Map of the World (Part II) liner notes.

 Jane Siberry – vocals, guitar, keyboards, production
Musicians
 Anne Bourne – keyboards
 Al Cross – drums
 Ken Myhr – guitar, guitar synthesizer
 John Switzer – bass, production
 Rob Yale – Fairlight CMI, keyboards

Production and additional personnel
 John Naslen – production, engineering

Release history

References

External links 
 

1985 songs
1985 singles
Jane Siberry songs
Songs written by Jane Siberry
Song recordings produced by Jane Siberry
Duke Street Records singles